was a Japanese politician who served as governor of Yamagata Prefecture (1906-1912), Yamaguchi Prefecture (1914-1916),
Mie Prefecture (1914-1916), Hiroshima Prefecture from April 1916 to May 1918, Kyoto Prefecture (1918-1921) and mayor of Kyoto (1921–1924).

Governors of Hiroshima
1867 births
1943 deaths
Japanese Home Ministry government officials
Governors of Yamagata Prefecture
Governors of Yamaguchi Prefecture
Governors of Mie Prefecture
Governors of Kyoto
Mayors of Kyoto